Theodosios Alexander is an American academic, engineer and author. He has served as faculty and in academic administration in four universities, in the UK and USA, following the award of four graduate degrees from MIT, and work in engineering industry.

Education
Graduating with a first class honors bachelor of science degree in Marine Engineering from the University of Newcastle upon Tyne in 1981, Alexander went on to complete three Master of Science degrees in naval architecture and marine engineering, ocean systems management, and mechanical engineering, all from the Massachusetts Institute of Technology (MIT). These were followed by a doctorate in mechanical engineering, also from MIT.

Career
In 1988, Alexander joined the Mechanical Engineering department at Washington University in St. Louis, Missouri where he was Director of the Internal Combustion Engines Lab and taught until 2001. From there he moved to the UK and was the James Watt Professor of Thermodynamics at the University of Glasgow, Scotland, United Kingdom until 2006. At the University of Glasgow, he developed the Center for Emerging Technologies and the Power and Propulsion Laboratory. From February 2006 until August 2012 he served as Chair of Energy Engineering at Queen Mary, University of London. He returned to St. Louis in 2012 to become Dean of Parks College of Engineering, Aviation and Technology of Saint Louis University in September 2012. He has also served as director of interdisciplinary research collaborations, as executive for new initiatives, and he also serves as a professor of aerospace and mechanical engineering.

Alexander has worked for Hellenic Shipyards Co., U.S. Navy Consultants John J. McMullen & Associates in Washington D.C., at the Northern Research and Engineering Corporation in Woburn, Massachusetts, and at McDonnell Douglas Corp. and The Boeing Company in St. Louis on propulsion-system studies. He remains active in numerous international consulting activities.

Research
Alexander’s research career has focused on thermal or fluid sciences and applications on the design of power and propulsion systems, energy conversion systems, renewable energy and engineering systems and components. He also conducted research on unsteady thermo-fluid dynamics and unsteady transport phenomena within those areas, the performance of turbomachinery and airfoils, a novel method to predict gas turbine and piston engine emissions, development of a novel Nutating disc engine for unmanned aerial vehicles and on fluid-dynamic modeling of the cardiovascular system, and development of mechanical circulatory support devices.

Alexander holds six patents on biomedical devices, he is a co-author of a textbook on turbomachinery design and has published more than 140 research papers in archival scientific journals.

Honors and awards
The UK National Health Service (NHS) Innovations Program awarded Alexander with the Innovator of the Year Award in 2008 and 2009 for his personal research on mechanical circulatory support devices.

2014 Kenneth Harris James Prize in Aerospace Engineering, Institute of Mechanical Engineers, UK.

2018 Literati Highly Commended Award.

Professional memberships and associations
 American Society of Mechanical Engineers (ASME)
 American Institute of Aeronautics and Astronautics (AIAA)
 Society of Automotive Engineers (SAE International)
 Sigma Xi, the Scientific Research Society

Representative publications
 “Optimization of axial pump characteristic dimensions and induced hemolysis for mechanical circulatory support devices” ASAIO journal, Vol 64, Issue 6, Nov 2018, pp. 727–734 DOI: 10.1097/MAT.0000000000000719
“The Effect of Geometry on the Efficiency and Hemolysis of Centrifugal Implantable Blood Pumps” ASAIO Journal, Vol 63, issue 1, Jan 2017, DOI: 10.1097/MAT.0000000000000457
“In-vitro investigation of hemodynamic responses of the cerebral, coronary and renal circulations with a rotary blood pump installed in the descending aorta” Medical Engineering & Physics, Vol 40, No. 1, p. 2-10, 2017, DOI: 10.1016/j.medengphy.2016.11.006
“Optimization of Centrifugal Pump Characteristic Dimensions for Mechanical Circulatory Support Devices” ASAIO journal, Vol 62, issue 5, p 545-551, Sep 2016, DOI: 10.1097/MAT.0000000000000393.
“The effects of ambulatory accelerations on the stability of a magnetically suspended impeller for an implantable blood pump” Artificial Organs, Aug 2016, DOI: 10.1111/aor.12749 
“Experimentally tested performance and emissions advantages of using natural-gas and hydrogen fuel mixture with diesel and rapeseed methyl ester as pilot fuels” Applied Energy, Volume 229, 1 Nov 2018, pp. 1260–1268. DOI: 10.1016/j.apenergy.2018.08.052
“Hydraulic characterization of diesel and water emulsions using momentum flux” Fuel, Vol 162, pp. 23–33. 2015, DOI: 10.1016/j.fuel.2015.08.016
“Natural gas fueled compression ignition engine performance and emissions maps with diesel and RME pilot fuels” Applied Energy, Vol 124, pp. 354–365, 2014. DOI: 10.1016/j.apenergy.2014.02.067
“Assessment of elliptic flame front propagation characteristics of iso-octane, gasoline, M85 and E85 in an optical engine”, Combustion and Flame, Vol 161, No (3), pp. 696–710, 2014, DOI: 10.1016/j.combustflame.2013.07.020
“Design of high-efficiency turbomachinery blades for energy conversion devices with the three dimensional prescribed surface curvature distribution blade design (CIRCLE) method” Applied Energy, Vol 89, No. 1, pp. 215–227, Jan 2012, DOI: 10.1016/j.apenergy.2011.07.004

See also
 Nutating disc engine

References

External links
Alexander's faculty profile at Parks College of Engineering, Aviation and Technology

Year of birth missing (living people)
American university and college faculty deans
Engineers from Athens
Living people
Saint Louis University faculty
Washington University in St. Louis faculty
Alumni of Newcastle University
Greek emigrants to the United States